El Desprecio (1991) is a Venezuelan telenovela that was produced by and seen on Venezuela's Radio Caracas Televisión.  It was written by Miriam Foti, Manuel González, Julio César Marmol, Reinaldo Rodríguez, and Morella Vega and directed by Luis Manzo.  It was distributed internationally by RCTV International.

Maricarmen Regueiro and Flavio Caballero starred as the main protagonists with Flor Nuñez as the main antagonist.

A remake was made in 2006 with the same name titled El desprecio.

Synopsis

El Desprecio is based on two distinct storylines. The first focuses on a young woman, her struggles, misfortunes, loneliness, loves, happiness, sadness and continuous search of personal dignity. The second vividly illustrates ambition for power and money. Both are played out by a parade of legendary characters whose actions reveal the extremities of devious plotting, intrigue and even murder.

The lead character Clara Ines Santamaria, an outcast who has unjustly been labeled mentally retarded because she stutters, lives a secluded life in the countryside in a hospice run by nuns. Society's grave misjudgment of Clara Ines will come to light and her profound intelligence will finally be discovered. Even though Clara Ines is actually a beautiful young woman, in the beginning she only inspires pity. She is from a wealthy family, but was raised by a nun who doesn't want her to know her true origins. One day, Clara Ines discovers the truth and sets off for the capital city to challenge her destiny. She meets Raul Velandro, a seemingly good man who immediately takes pity on her and extends his assistance. He tells her that he is a member of the family she is seeking, he sets a trap, and Clara Ines becomes involved in a series of circumstances that comprise the compelling plot of El Desprecio.

Cast
 Flavio Caballero as Raúl Velandró
 Maricarmen Regueiro as Clara Inés Santamaría
 Carlos Márquez as Israel Santamaría
Laura Brey as Corina Madrid de Velandró
 Dilia Waikarán as Elisenda Medina
 Ana Karina Manco as Tamara Campos
 Alberto Álvarez as Cirilo Santamaría
 Virgilio Galindo as Pereto
 Leopoldo Renault as Nicolás Santamaría
 Tomás Henriquez 
 Sonya Smith as Violeta Velandró
 Ileana Jacket as Karen de Santamaría

References

External links
 

1991 telenovelas
RCTV telenovelas
Venezuelan telenovelas
1991 Venezuelan television series debuts
1991 Venezuelan television series endings
Spanish-language telenovelas
Television shows set in Venezuela